DTour (styled as DTOUR) is a Canadian English language specialty channel owned by Corus Entertainment.

The channel was originally established by Canwest in 1997 as Prime, a cable companion to Global with a general entertainment format focusing on classic series and programming acquired from Global and CH. In 2006, the channel was re-branded as TVTropolis, carrying a similar format but with a focus on contemporary sitcoms and dramas from the 1980s and 90's, as well as pop culture-themed programs. In 2013, the channel was re-launched as DTour, which largely draws from the U.S. cable network Travel Channel, as well as other co-owned sister networks.

History
The channel was launched as Prime on October 17, 1997, under the ownership of Canwest. The Canadian Radio-television and Telecommunications Commission (CRTC) licensed Prime in 1996 as a specialty television service directed towards men and women 50 years of age and older. However, the channel did not explicitly market itself as a channel for the "baby boomer" generation, preferring instead to position itself as a general entertainment channel. Prime's slogan, on-air and in advertising, was "Canada's Entertainment Network".

Prime's schedule featured a mix of general interest television programs, including home improvement and design series, along with classic television series such as The Golden Girls, M*A*S*H, All in the Family, The Cosby Show and Newhart. It also hosted repeat showings of several series from sister broadcast networks Global and CH, including The Apprentice, The Restaurant, Bob and Margaret, The Price Is Right, Entertainment Tonight Canada and Extreme Makeover: Home Edition.

With the launch of the cable channel DejaView (also owned by Canwest) in 2001, showing similar programming to Prime (classic television programs from the 1960s, 1970s and 1980s), the channel's focus shifted to shows from the late 1980s and beyond.

On June 1, 2006, Prime was renamed TVTropolis, which initially primarily focused on sitcoms and dramas from the 1980s and 1990s (such as Seinfeld and Beverly Hills 90210, branded under the slogan Hit TV Lives Here), with additional television series focused on television pop culture (such as Inside the Box and FANatical). Over time, the channel lessened its emphasis on sitcoms and dramas, focusing on other programs such as reality series, game shows and lifestyle series, with little emphasis on theme of television pop culture, rather focusing on general entertainment.

2010-present
On October 27, 2010, Shaw Communications purchased Canwest after it had entered into creditor bankruptcy protection in late 2009. As a result, Shaw acquired control of Canwest's stake in TVtropolis and rebranded Canwest as Shaw Media. On January 14, 2013, Shaw announced that it would purchase the remaining interest in TVtropolis from Rogers Communications for $59 million, bringing its total to 100%.

On June 5, 2013, at its annual upfront, Shaw conspicuously removed any reference to TVtropolis in announcing its fall programming plans, while announcing a "new" lifestyle channel named DTour (stylized as DTOUR). It was later confirmed through a Telus update to subscribers that DTour would be launched as a rebranded TVtropolis on August 26, 2013. 
The relaunch of the channel as DTour occurred that day at 6:00 a.m. Eastern Time; using its former slogan: “New Channel. New perspective.”, and then switching to, its current slogan:”See Where it Takes You”. A high definition feed of DTour was introduced on Shaw Cable on September 5, 2013, before being added to all other major television providers as years went by. Following the rebrand, fellow Shaw Media channel DejaView decided to add some of the 1990s vintage series that had aired in repeats on TVtropolis, including Everybody Loves Raymond.

DTour largely features programming from Travel Channel in the U.S. (including Adam Richman's Fandemonium, Hotel Impossible and Bizarre Foods with Andrew Zimmern). Incidentally, Travel Channel was at that point controlled by Scripps Networks Interactive, which was already partnering with Shaw on the Canadian versions of Food Network, HGTV and DIY Network. However, DTour was not explicitly marketed as a "travel" service, as it would have conflicted with Travel + Escape (now T+E) which had sole use of the travel niche at the time under the CRTC's channel categorization rules (those rules have since been revoked, and T+E subsequently abandoned the travel genre in favor of paranormal shows and some films).

On April 1, 2016, DTour's parent company Shaw Media was sold to Corus Entertainment. New sister stations were given at the same time.

Programming

DTour's lineup consists primarily of travel-oriented shows, many of which are sourced from Travel Channel. As TVTropolis, it aired programming ranging from 1980s and 1990s sitcoms, animated series, reality series, game shows, and other general entertainment programming. In marketing material, it was described as a channel focusing on "hit" television series and celebrities that "have defined pop culture".

Logos

Prime did not use the crescent device, typical of many Canwest Global channels, until later in 1998. Its first logo was the word PRIME in Microgramma font and instead of "Canada's Entertainment Network" used the slogan "Canada's Superstation" (later used by CJON-DT as its slogan).

See also
DejaView
MovieTime
Global
Crime + Investigation

References

External links
 

Analog cable television networks in Canada
Television channels and stations established in 1997
1997 establishments in Canada
Corus Entertainment networks
English-language television stations in Canada